Koiak 30 - Coptic Calendar - Tobi 2

The first day of the Coptic month of Tobi, the fifth month of the Coptic year. On a common year, this day corresponds to December 27, of the Julian Calendar, and January 9, of the Gregorian Calendar. This day falls in the Coptic season of Peret, the season of emergence.

Commemorations

Saints 

 The martyrdom of Saint Stephen the Archdeacon, the Protomartyr 
 The martyrdom of Saint Leontius 
 The martyrdom of Saint Dioscorus and Saint Esculapius, his brother

References 

Days of the Coptic calendar